Midnight Ridazz is a late-night group bicycle ride that celebrates bicycle culture in Los Angeles. The ride takes place on city streets, has no sponsors, is not sanctioned by any government agency, and does not require registration or membership in a club. Traditionally, the ride has taken place on the second Friday of every month at about 10:00 PM from a starting point in Echo Park; however, the surge of popularity it has enjoyed in recent years has made it possible for rides to occur much more frequently and in diverse parts of the city. If the ride passes through downtown Los Angeles it is traditional for the route to include the 2nd Street Tunnel.

History 
Midnight Ridazz began in February, 2004 when six cyclists and two skateboarders in Echo Park took an impromptu tour of the fountains in downtown Los Angeles. The idea of taking a monthly late night group bicycle ride to see interesting and unusual aspects of Los Angeles not ordinarily accessible or meaningfully experienced from an automobile spread quickly by word of mouth, and within several months the group grew to over five times its original size. Before the ride celebrated its first anniversary in February 2005, the monthly turnout had swollen to well over a hundred riders. As the ride grew, the social and organizational dynamic changed. What had started out as a small gathering of friends had become first a neighborhood and then a citywide phenomenon. Several of the original riders voluntarily took on the responsibility of planning routes, printing route slips for distribution to participants, inventing themes for the rides and publicizing them, and helping riders with mechanical difficulties along the way.

By the summer of 2006, Midnight Ridazz had grown to such an extent that often more than a thousand riders could be expected to show up at the traditional meeting point in the parking lot of the Pioneer Chicken fast-food restaurant on Echo Park Avenue off of Sunset Boulevard. The rapid growth of the ride was beginning to overwhelm the neighborhood where riders met, and perhaps more importantly, it was beginning to overwhelm the organizers. The ride had grown unwieldy; riders were getting lost, altercations and accidents involving riders and frustrated motorists were becoming common, and it was no longer practical to stop the ride to wait for participants with mechanical problems. The organizers' response to this was to step down and allow responsibility for the rides to devolve to the participants, and to encourage splitting Midnight Ridazz from one large monthly ride into several more frequent regional rides. The transition worked remarkably well, due at least in part to the advent of a Midnight Ridazz website with a discussion forum and a ride calendar open to anybody who wished to organize and announce a group ride.

Culture and ethic 
Midnight Ridazz is rooted in a punk ethos. It was partly the aim of the original riders and organizers to challenge both the dominant means of transportation and the prevailing mode of entertainment in Los Angeles, a city largely designed around the private automobile and one in which weekend entertainment is widely assumed to involve some kind of commercial transaction. Midnight Ridazz and its most prominent promoters do not overtly claim to be engaging in activism, apart from taking the position that "riding a bicycle in this country in and of itself IS the political act." Ridazz bears some resemblance to the pro-bicycle Critical Mass phenomenon in that both involve large groups of cyclists temporarily taking over city streets in public view. However, it is distinct from Critical Mass in that the routes are planned by self-appointed caretakers, and the atmosphere revolves around party culture and fun rather than political demonstration. 

Inclusiveness has long been a dominant cultural component in Midnight Ridazz. Rides are usually planned and paced so as to allow any reasonably healthy adult with a roadworthy bicycle and the ability to ride it to participate. Accordingly, the rides have attracted a wide cross-section of the cycling community in Los Angeles--bicycle messengers, bicycle commuters, utility cyclists, fixed gear enthusiasts, recreational riders, racers, and so on—although the convergence of different groups of cyclists has not been without occasional friction.

Midnight Ridazz has inspired many new regular rides and bicycle groups in the Los Angeles area and has been credited with helping to popularize bicycle ride culture in Los Angeles.

The Annual All City Toy Ride 
Since December 2006 the Midnight Ridazz have hosted The All City Toy Ride. The charity bicycle ride traditionally takes place on the second Friday in December.
Participants are asked to bring a toy up to $25 in value to be donated to a local charity. Past charities to receive toys from the event include The Los Angeles Department of Child Services, The Los Angeles Fire Department's: Spark of Love, The Alliance for Children's Rights, Los Angeles Legal Aid and the East LA Women's Center. 
The event consists of several rides, each originating for different parts of Los Angeles County.

External links 
KCET/PBS Covers the history of Midnight Ridazz
City Beat Rides with the Ridazz
Laist photo essay of the clown ride
Metroblogging LA: 1700+ Ridazz
Metroblogging LA: Midnight Ridazz
Metroblogging LA: Midnight Ridazz, you're getting swarmer
Los Angeles Alternative Press: Vicious Cycling
San Diego City Beat: Party On Wheels
New York Times: After Dark Bicycle Rallies
Los Angeles Times: Midnight Ridazz are bound to keep on riding
Night Riders Pedal L.A. With Mettle, Los Angeles Times,   June 12, 2005 "About 500 bicyclists make an environmental statement with tongue in cheek"
Video interview of Los Angeles freeway cyclists by Zadi Diaz of EPIC FU, weekly web show that covers online pop culture (August 7, 2008)
Los Angeles Met Blogs on The All City Toy Ride*
MidnightRidazz

References 

Cycling in Los Angeles
Culture of Los Angeles
DIY culture
Cycling clubs
2004 establishments in California